The Pistolet modèle 1786 was a flintlock Navy pistol, in service in French units from 1786 and made until 1806, when it was superseded by the Pistolet modèle An XIII.

The Pistolet modèle 1786 cas as a replacement for the Pistolet modèle 1779, which was found wanting.

Sources and references 

 Pistolet de bord 1786 
 PISTOLET DE BORD MODELE 1786 ( MARINE)

Firearms of France
Single-shot pistols
Black-powder pistols